Espejos del Alma is the fifteenth studio album by Mexican singer Yuri. It was released on September 12, 1995 through Sony Music Latin and Columbia Records. It was produced by Alejandro Zepeda and Carlos Murguía. The album was not as successful as her previous records, due to the personal and professional struggles at the time.

History
In February 1995, Yuri attended the 1995 Viña del Mar International Song Festival, where she met with Rodrigo Espinosa, vocalist of the Chilean group Aleste, with whom she would later marry. At that time, the rhythm of work devastated the singer's health, and when she began to record the album, she was diagnosed with cancer on her vocal cords, but it was treated and healed. During this time, she declared that promiscuity was a principal part of her sexual life and alcohol. Due to this, she had a breakdown and tried to kill herself; this situation made her leave Catholicism and become a Christian.

Singles and commercial performance
The first single, "De qué te vale fingir" was another hit, topping the charts in Mexico and Panama. However, due to Yuri's conversion to Evangelicalism, the record label didn't provide enough promotion to the album, becoming one of Yuri's least successful albums to date.

Track listing

Production
 Executive producer: Fernando Figueroa
 Director: Alex Zepeda
 Musical arrangements: Alex Zepeda and Carlos Murguía
 Musicians: Michael Landau, José Hernández, Carlos Murguía, Alex Zepeda, Nando Hernández, John Harrison, Peter Strawvack, Leo Carrot
 Backing vocals: Mariana Rivera, Renata Rivera, Alfredo Calderón, Carlos Murguía, Alex Zepeda
 Recorded in: AZTECH Lab. Estudios, Westlake Audio, L.A., Ca.
 Mix engineer: Chris Brooke and Tony Meado
 Mastering: Bernie Grundman Mastering by Chris Brooke 
 Art direction: Rocio Larrazolo
 Graphic design: Alicia V. Sodi and César Saldaña
 Photography:  Carlos Somonte
 Make up: Eduardo Arias and Eduardo Gasset

References

1995 albums
Yuri (Mexican singer) albums